June Nunatak is the central of three nunataks in mid-stream of the upper Liv Glacier, standing about  southeast of Mount Wells, in the Queen Maud Mountains of Antarctica. It was named by the Southern party of the New Zealand Geological Survey Antarctic Expedition (1961–62) for Harold June, an aviator and engineer on the South Pole flight of U.S. Navy Commander Richard E. Byrd in 1929.

References

Nunataks of the Ross Dependency
Dufek Coast